MagForce AG is a publicly traded German company based in Berlin, Germany that develops medical devices that generate magnetic hyperthermia to treat cancer. The company was founded in 1997 as a spin-off from Charité.

MagForce has developed a solution of iron oxide nanoparticles that is directly injected into the tumor. A couple of days later, the person with the tumor is placed inside a large piece of equipment similar to an MRI machine, also manufactured by MagForce, which creates a strong, fast-changing magnetic field.  The changing magnetic field causes the particles to vibrate, which in turn generates heat, destroying the tissue, or at least making the tumor more vulnerable to other treatments, like radiation.  Generally there are six such sessions in the machine.

The company was listed on the Frankfurt exchange in 2007, and received the CE mark for its system in 2010.

By 2013, sales of the system were poor; one reason for that was that the company had been run with little money, raising only about 11 million euros by 2010, and had scant clinical trial with which to convince oncologists that its system was effective and safe.  The CEOs,  Hoda Tawfik and Christian von Volkmann, re-evaluated the company's strategy, and raised 33.3 million euros, and used about half of that to retire debt. Around that time they hired Ben J. Lipps, former chairman of Fresenius Medical Care, to become CEO. The company established a US subsidiary, which raised around $15M in 2014 to pursue US approval.  In 2017 MagForce obtained access to 35M euros in loans from the European Investment Bank under the Juncker Plan.

The FOCUS reports in 2018 on the company's US strategy: with the specially founded subsidiary Magforce USA, Inc. is to be granted in the United States for the treatment of prostate cancer, which in the case of greater patient volume for faster refinancing of the research and would cause development costs. In 2018, the corresponding approval study was approved by the responsible authority Food and Drug Administration and is currently in the implementation. Ben Lipps: “FDA approval was a much greater success than the capital market has so far realized. It is important to understand that the FDA was classified as a medical technology product some time ago. The FDA requirements for a medical device are significantly less stressful and risky. If we can provide our forecast results in the upcoming study, which refers to the treatment of prostate cancer, we will quickly receive the commercial approval.”

The equipment required to generate the alternating magnetic field, the patented NanoActivator, is currently available in clinics in Berlin, Cologne, Münster, Kiel and Frankfurt. A mobile variant of the apparatus was presented in early 2019 in Lublin, eastern Poland. The relatively high acquisition costs of this technology have so far stood in the way of a commercial breakthrough. Another obstacle to the acceptance of the method is the lack of automatic reimbursement by the health insurance companies. Up to now, the costs of the procedure, which is approved throughout Europe, have been covered, but only after the patient has paid in advance.

The necessary apparatus to produce the magnetic change field, the patented nanoactivator, is currently available in clinics in Berlin, Cologne, Münster, Kiel and Frankfurt. A mobile variant of the apparatus was presented in the Eastern Polish Lublin in early 2019. So far, the relatively high acquisition costs of this technology have stood in the way of a commercial breakthrough. Another obstacle in the acceptance of the method is the lack of automatic reimbursement by the health insurance companies. So far, the costs of the procedure approved across Europe have been covered, but only after the patient's private advance.

The company began insolvency proceedings in July 2022.

References

External links 
 

Medical technology companies of Germany
Companies listed on the Frankfurt Stock Exchange
Companies based in Berlin
1997 establishments in Germany